The Watson River is a river located in Far North Queensland, Australia.

The headwaters of the river rise near the Aurukun Road and flows in a south westerly direction to Watson Crossing and continues through a valley before discharging into Archer Bay near Aurukun along with the Archer River and the Ward River, then onto the Gulf of Carpentaria. From source to mouth, the Watson River is joined by four tributaries; descending  over its  course.

The catchment contains large wetland areas with the margins covered in stringybark forests and paperbark lined lagoons that are vital refuges for wildlife during the dry season.

Several species of fish are known to inhabit the river including the empire gudgeon, northern trout gudgeon, chequered rainbowfish,  black-banded rainbowfish, banded rainbowfish, spotted blue-eye, Obbes catfish, delicate blue-eyes fish and barramundi.
 
The traditional owners of the area are the Wik, Winda winda and Mbelwum peoples.

See also

References

Rivers of Far North Queensland
Gulf of Carpentaria